Nangola is a small town and commune in the Cercle of Dioila in the Koulikoro Region of southern Mali. In 1998 the commune had a population of 12,642.

References

Communes of Koulikoro Region